A milk cup is a hollow, lightweight plastic disk worn inside the brassiere to help correct a flat or inverted nipple.

Milk cup may also refer to:

 SuperCupNI, an international youth football tournament formerly known as Milk Cup or Dale Farm Milk Cup
 EFL Cup, an English football competition known as the Milk Cup during its sponsorship with the Milk Marketing Board between 1982 and 1986